Daniel Westphal  is a Northern Mariana Islander footballer who plays as a defender.

References 

Living people
Northern Mariana Islands footballers
Northern Mariana Islands international footballers
Association football defenders
1970 births